St. Joseph's Hospital is a 451-bed medical facility in Syracuse, New York. The hospital is one of a growing number with "a separate psychiatric emergency department;" theirs has 10 beds and it opened in 2007.

History
In the mid-nineteenth century, many German and Irish immigrants worked on the 
Erie and Oswego canals, the railroad, or for salt producers. Eight Sisters of St. Francis of Philadelphia came to Syracuse in March 1860 to teach at Assumption School and at St. Joseph's in Utica. Working out of St. Anthony's Convent, they soon began to provide at-home care for the sick. In 1869, the sisters purchased the Samsel property on Prospect Hill, a former dance hall and saloon, and on May 6, opened St. Joseph's Hospital, Syracuse's first public hospital. Sister Dominic was in charge, ssisted by Sisters Mechtildes, Veronica, Johanna, and Hyacinthe.The hospital had a unique charter for its time – open to caring for the sick without distinction as to a person’s nationality, religion or color.

Mother Marianne Cope served as St. Joe’s administrator from 1870 to 1877. In 1883 she relocated with six other sisters to Hawaiʻi to care for persons suffering leprosy on the island of Molokaʻi and aid in developing the medical infrastructure in Hawaiʻi. Cope was canonized by Pope Benedict XVI on October 21, 2012.

In 1871 Geneva Medical College was transferred to Syracuse University. One of the reasons for the move was that Syracuse had a hospital. Many of the city's businessmen and politicians supported the work of the hospital. In 1878 mayor James J. Belden formed a committee of citizens, St. Joseph's Hospital Aid Society, to look after the interests of St. Joseph's. Local businessman John R. Clancy served as financial secretary. Dennis McCarthy followed Theodore Dissel as president; he was later followed by Burns Lyman Smith and Harvey D. Burrill of the Syracuse Journal.

The hospital was enlarged in 1882 by an addition, and again in 1896 with the construction of a large annex. The new hospital chapel was dedicated May 17, 1897. The school of nursing opened in 1898. St. Joseph's College of Nursing offers an  applied science degree with a major in nursing. A Dual Degree Partnership in Nursing (DDPN) with Le Moyne College allows students to achieve both an associate and a baccalaureate degree in four years.

In July 1918, St. Joseph’s was one of a number of local hospitals providing emergency care to those
injured in an explosion of TNT at the munitions factory at Split Rock. 

On its 100th anniversary, St. Joseph's Hospital changed its name to "St. Joseph's Hospital Health Center" to reflect the greater scope of services provided. In 1971 St. Joseph's appointed its first lay administrator. That same year saw the creation of the Home Health Care Agency. In 1994, St. Joe's instituted a primary care program at a number of off-campus sites.

Present day
The 15-bed facility has grown to a 451-bed hospital; part of a regionwide healthcare system called St. Joseph’s Health. In April 2016, St. Joseph's added twenty new beds to its critical care unit. In 2016, St. Joseph's was assessed $3.2 million for employing unlicensed mental health counselors. President and CEO, Kathy Ruscitto, said it was a billing issue arising from "...a misinterpretation of unclear regulations..." The hospital has a heliport. St Joseph's Hospital is located approximately 0.4 mile from the Erie Canal Bike Trail. 

In April 2020, in response to New York State's directive for hospital's to halt elective surgeries as a Covid precaution, St Joseph's furloughed 500 employees, linking the move to the suspension of outpatient procedures.

References

External links
 St. Joseph's website
 
 Hunter, Thomas. "Celebrating the glorious history of St. Joseph’s Hospital", The Central New York Business Journal, December 27, 2021 

Hospitals in New York (state)